The Panic in Needle Park is a 1971 American drama film directed by Jerry Schatzberg and starring Al Pacino (in his first lead role) and Kitty Winn. The screenplay was written by Joan Didion and John Gregory Dunne, adapted from the 1966 novel by James Mills.

The film portrays life among a group of heroin addicts who hang out in "Needle Park" (a nickname at that time for Sherman Square on Manhattan's Upper West Side near 72nd Street and Broadway). The film is a love story between Bobby (Pacino), a young addict and small-time hustler, and Helen (Kitty Winn), a restless woman who finds Bobby charismatic. She becomes an addict, and life goes downhill for them both as their addictions worsen, eventually leading to a series of betrayals.

Plot 
In New York City, Helen returns to the apartment she shares with her boyfriend, Marco, after enduring an unhygienic and inept abortion. Helen becomes ill and Bobby, an amiable small-time drug dealer to whom Marco owes money, shows unexpected gentleness and concern for her. Helen considers returning to her dysfunctional family but moves in with Bobby, and when she finds him taking drugs, he explains that he is not an addict, but only uses a little. At Sherman Square  nicknamed Needle Park for being a location where addicts trade and use drugs  Bobby introduces Helen to various acquaintances, including his brother Hank, who burgles for a living. Helen witnesses the intricate ritual of addicts shooting up heroin.

Bobby and Helen are eventually evicted from their apartment and move into a sleazier building. After Bobby asks her to score heroin for him, Helen and the dealer, Freddie, are arrested by Detective Hotch. Hotch asks Helen, "Bobby's got you scoring for him already, huh?" implying this is a common trend for Bobby and his girlfriends. He then explains to Helen what it's like when there is a panic in Needle Park; a panic is when the heroin supply on the street is low and addicts begin to turn on each other, often "ratting" or turning others in to the police in return for favors. Hotch unexpectedly releases Helen and she returns to Bobby, who begins to use drugs more heavily. Helen eventually begins to shoot up as well.

Bobby soon realizes Helen is using and proposes marriage to her. Hank asks what they will live on and offers Bobby work as a burglar, to which Helen objects and insists that she will get a job. However, Helen quickly quits her new waitress job after getting customer orders muddled. Just before Bobby is to assist Hank in a burglary, he overdoses. Hank is angry with Bobby for jeopardizing his plans, but he allows Bobby to assist him on another night, during which Bobby is arrested. While he is in jail, Helen finds it harder to get drugs and ends up having sex with Hank, after which they do heroin together. When Bobby is released, he viciously beats Helen.

Bobby persuades Santo, a major drug dealer, to let him handle distribution in Needle Park, while Helen turns to prostitution for fast money. After Bobby distributes Santo's drugs, Needle Park residents are happy to have a reliable source. As Helen's health deteriorates from increasing drug use, her relationship with Bobby suffers, and Hotch keeps an eye on her. After Helen and one of her customers are detained, Hotch asks the arresting officer not to book her, as he needs her for something he is planning.

Helen's mother writes to her, inviting Helen to meet family friends who are visiting the city. Reluctantly, Helen agrees, dressing carefully to hide the track marks on her arms. Instead of meeting the friends, she picks up a customer, who Bobby scares away when he finds them together. Realizing they have been through a lot, they take the ferry to the countryside and buy a puppy. On the return trip, they discuss making a fresh start by moving away from Needle Park, but Bobby refuses and convinces Helen to shoot up in a men's room. When the puppy begins to whine, Bobby puts it outside the restroom, and when Helen discovers the dog missing, she sees it just before it falls off the end of the ferry into the water.

Helen goes to see her ex-boyfriend, Marco, but soon returns to Bobby to steal drugs from him. Needing to get high, Helen goes to a doctor claiming she needs drugs for pain. Aware Helen is an addict, the doctor gives her a few samples and tells her never to return. She is arrested for selling some pills to children, during which Hotch warns her about the dangers of the women's prison. Knowing that Bobby can lead them to Santo, he offers Helen a deal if she will help them to catch Bobby in the act of picking up a drug shipment.

In the next two weeks, Hotch approaches Helen several times, reminding her of her pending trial. Depressed, she increases her drug use, but finally agrees to help the police. One night Helen and Hotch watch a squad of policemen apprehend Bobby, who is in possession of a large amount of heroin. When Bobby spots Helen on the street, he yells at her. Months later, when he is released from jail, Helen waits for him at the gate. Although his first impulse is to rebuff her, he turns to her and asks her, "Well?", and together they walk away.

Cast

Production 
The film was based on a novel by James Mills, which had been based on Mills's two-part pictorial essay in the 26 February and March 5, 1965 issues of Life magazine. According to a November 1967 Hollywood Reporter news item, film rights for the novel were purchased by Avco Embassy Pictures and, according to a March 1969 Variety news item, the film rights were later bought by producer Dominick Dunne, whose brother and sister-in-law, John Gregory Dunne and Joan Didion wrote the screenplay. 
 
As noted in the onscreen credits, the film was shot entirely in New York City. According to the film's studio production notes, portions were shot at Needle Park and the Upper West Side area of New York City, at Riverside Park, in a New York City prison and hospital ward, on the Staten Island Ferry, and in the East Village. The studio notes reported that makeup man Herman Buchman studied the "track" marks on the arms of hospital patients and victims in morgues and achieved an authentic look for the actors by using a liquid called Flexible Collodion. In scenes in which actors appear to inject themselves, a registered nurse was on set, serving as a technical advisor.

Ned Rorem was to compose the film's score until it was decided that no music would be used (his isolated and unused score is included as a special feature in the Blu-ray).  Much of the film features cinéma vérité-style footage. It is believed to be the first mainstream film to feature actual drug injection.

Didion and Dunne visited Jim Morrison, lead singer of The Doors, during the recording of the album Waiting For The Sun as he was considered for the role of Bobby, but went with Pacino instead.

Release 
Upon its release in 1971 some European film boards/classifications such as Germany gave the film an "X" rating for its harsh and realistic view of drug use and violence and it was banned completely in the UK until 1974. Many of these boards' decisions were made due to aspects of these films that were not necessarily pornographic, as was the case with other significant works such as Hodges's Get Carter, Peckinpah's Straw Dogs, Kubrick's Clockwork Orange (all from 1971) and Boorman's Deliverance (1972). The early 1970s are therefore often cited to be the significant phase of X-rated movies that were not necessarily pornographic.

The Panic in Needle Park marked Al Pacino's first starring feature film role, although it was neither his nor Kitty Winn's feature film debut, as the studio notes and some reviews erroneously reported. It was Raul Julia's first feature film.

Home media 
The film was released on Blu-ray through Twilight Time on June 14, 2016 in their usual limitation to producing only 3,000 copies.

Reception 
On Rotten Tomatoes, the film has an approval rating of 80% based on 15 reviews, with a weighted average of 7.2/10.

Roger Ebert of the Chicago Sun-Times gave the film three-and-a-half stars out of four and wrote that "the movie lives and moves. It is not filled with quick cutting or gimmicky editing, but Jerry Schatzberg's direction is so confident that we cover the ground effortlessly. We meet the characters, we get to know the world. Especially, we get to know this relationship between Bobby and Helen, and thank God the filmmakers were tasteful enough not to kill them off at the end just because that's so fashionable these days." Roger Greenspun of The New York Times stated in a more mixed review that the film "vacillates between expressive slice-of-life and some of the less durable minor conventions of big-city melodrama." Arthur D. Murphy of Variety lauded the film as "a total triumph. Gritty, gutsy, compelling, and vivid to the point of revulsion yet so artistically perfect one cannot look away, it is an overpowering tragedy about urban drug addiction."

Gene Siskel of the Chicago Tribune gave the film two stars out of four and wrote, "Despite its many closeups of needles puncturing veins, 'Panic' is little more than a traditional love story set in New York's West Side drug culture ... The film is neither an especially interesting drama nor an effective antidrug film. I think director Jerry Schatzberg would like it to be both." Charles Champlin of the Los Angeles Times said that it "is the latest of the drug movies. It is also, I think, the best of them. But if it's a peak, it's also a dead end—that is, it both defines and exhausts the possibilities of the movie which contents itself with describing (however accurately and horrifyingly) the drug milieu and does not choose to go beyond surfaces to causes." Gary Arnold of The Washington Post wrote "Whatever social value The Panic in Needle Park aspired to its effectively canceled by its lack of dramatic interest. This is one of those movies that never seems to get off the low burner."

Stanley Kauffmann of The New Republic  described Panic in Needle Park as "rotten".

Awards 

For her portrayal of Helen, Winn won the Best Actress Award at the 1971 Cannes Film Festival. The film and its director, Jerry Schatzberg, were also nominated for the Palme d'Or.

See also
 List of American films of 1971

References

External links
 
 
 
 
 

20th Century Fox films
1971 romantic drama films
1971 films
American romantic drama films
1970s English-language films
Films about abortion
Films about heroin addiction
Films based on American novels
Films directed by Jerry Schatzberg
Films set in New York City
Films shot in New York City
Films about addiction
1970s American films
Films without soundtracks